During the 1996 Australian Football League (AFL) season 81 Australian rules footballers made their AFL debut with 48 others playing their first game for a new club.

Summary

AFL debuts

Change of AFL club

References
Full listing of players who made their AFL or club debut in 1996

Australian rules football records and statistics
Australian rules football-related lists
Debut